Jean Lucas de Souza Oliveira (born 22 June 1998), known as Jean Lucas, is a Brazilian professional footballer who plays as a defensive midfielder for Ligue 1 club Monaco.

Club career

Flamengo
Born in Rio de Janeiro, Jean Lucas started his career with Nova Iguaçu's youth setup. Released at the age of 15, he represented Bonsucesso before joining Flamengo in 2015.

In December 2017, Jean Lucas was definitely promoted to the first team ahead of the 2018 season by manager Reinaldo Rueda. He made his senior debut the following 17 January, starting in a 2–0 Campeonato Carioca away win against Volta Redonda and winning praise for his performance.

Jean Lucas renewed his contract with Flamengo on 16 February 2018, signing until 2021 with a €30 million clause. He made his Série A debut on 22 April, coming on as a late substitute for Lucas Paquetá in a 2–0 home win over América Mineiro.

Jean Lucas made his debut in a continental competition on 24 May 2018, starting in a 0–0 draw against River Plate at the Monumental de Núñez, for the year's Copa Libertadores.

Loan to Santos
On 9 February 2019, Jean Lucas joined fellow top tier club Santos on loan until the end of the season. Initially a backup to Alison and Carlos Sánchez, he became a regular starter under Jorge Sampaoli.

Lyon
On 20 June 2019, Flamengo accepted an €8 million offer from Lyon for Jean Lucas. He officially joined the club five days later, signing a five-year deal.

Loan to Brest 
Having featured sparingly for Lyon, Jean Lucas joined league rivals Brest on loan for the second half of the 2020–21 season in January 2021.

Monaco  
On 2 August 2021, Jean Lucas signed for fellow Ligue 1 club Monaco on a five-year contract. The transfer fee of the deal was of €11 million plus €1 million in bonuses, and Lyon are entitled to 15% of a future sale of Jean Lucas.

Career statistics

Honours 
Lyon

 Coupe de la Ligue runner-up: 2019–20

References

External links

 Profile at the AS Monaco FC website
 
 

1998 births
Living people
Footballers from Rio de Janeiro (city)
Brazilian footballers
Association football midfielders
Campeonato Brasileiro Série A players
Ligue 1 players
Championnat National 2 players
CR Flamengo footballers
Santos FC players
Olympique Lyonnais players
Stade Brestois 29 players
AS Monaco FC players
Brazilian expatriate footballers
Brazilian expatriate sportspeople in France
Brazilian expatriate sportspeople in Monaco
Expatriate footballers in France
Expatriate footballers in Monaco
Brazil youth international footballers